Impressionists in Winter: Effets de Neige was a late 20th-century art exhibition featuring 63 Impressionist winter landscape paintings by artists  Claude Monet, Pierre-Auguste Renoir, Camille Pissarro, Alfred Sisley, Gustave Caillebotte, and Paul Gauguin.  

Influenced by the work of art historian Charles Moffett and curated by  Eliza Rathbone,  Impressionists in Winter was sponsored by J.P. Morgan & Co. and opened in 1998 at The Phillips Collection art museum in Washington, D.C.  In 1999, the exhibition appeared at the Yerba Buena Center for the Arts in San Francisco and the Brooklyn Museum in New York City.

Notes

References
Baker, Kenneth. (1999). That's Cold! Exhibition shows how much feeling and structure impressionists packed into winter canvases. San Francisco Chronicle. Retrieved September 30, 2012.
Dobrzynski, Judith H. (1999). "Travel Advisory; Snow Will Cover Walls in Brooklyn in Summer". The New York Times, May 23.
Moffett, Charles S. (1999). Impressionists in Winter: Effets de Neige. Phillips Collection. .
Myers, Chuck (1998). "Winter Wonderland(scapes)". Chicago Tribune.
Rathbone, Eliza E. (1999). "Snowy Landscapes". Southwest Art 28 (10). ISSN 0192-4214. 
Richard, Paul (1998). "At the Phillips, a Midwinter Day's Dream". The Washington Post. Retrieved April 14, 2012. 

Art exhibitions in the United States
Impressionism